Kalab-e Sufian may refer to:
 Kalab-e Sufian-e Olya
 Kalab-e Sufian-e Sofla